Estádio Pelé is a multi-purpose stadium in Praia, Cape Verde. Used for football matches, it is home to the Cape Verde National football team. The stadium has an announced capacity of 15,000 people. It is owned by the government of Cape Verde, and operated by an appointed Commission of Stadium Administration. Following the death of Brazilian footballer Pelé, in January 2023 it was announced that the stadium would be renamed Estádio Pelé in tribute.

History
Funded by the Chinese government, the building started in October 2010, due to be completed in June 2012. A 15-month delay, due to a change aimed at increasing the number of seats from 10,000 to 15,000, moved the planned inauguration date to October 2013. Eventually the stadium was opened in August 2014.

References

Football venues in Cape Verde
Buildings and structures in Praia
Cape Verde
Athletics (track and field) venues in Cape Verde
Multi-purpose stadiums in Cape Verde